Roderick Douglas Bush (November 12, 1945 – December 5, 2013) was an U.S. born sociologist, social activist, author, public intellectual author and academic primarily concerning the Civil rights movement (1865–1896).

Biography
Born on November 12, 1945, Bush grew up in the "Jim Crow" South before moving to Rochester, New York, as a child.  As a teen, he attended Howard University and became involved in the Black Power Movement.  He attended the University of Kansas, where he began his doctoral work.  He left to become a full-time political activist only to return to academia in 1998. He earned his PH.D from Binghamton University in 1992.  He served as a faculty member at St. John's University as a Sociology Professor.

Bush died on December 5, 2013.

Academic specialization
At a collegiate level he taught and specialized in race and ethnicity, the black experience, social movements, world-systems studies, globalization, social inequality, social change, urban sociology, community organizing, political sociology.

Awards

 2015: U.S. Higher Education Faculty Awards, Vol. 1, best overall faculty member, best researcher/scholar, and most helpful to students.
 2014: American Sociological Association Marxist Section Lifetime Achievement Award
 Professor-Service to Students Seton Hall University 9/97-5/98 
 University Research Fellow Seton Hall University 6/97-8/97 
 Ford Foundation PostDoctoral 
 Fellow Seton Hall University 9/93-8/94 
 University Fellow SUNY Binghamton 1/88-6/88 
 U.S. Public Health Fellow University of Kansas 9/67-6/70 
 National Competitive Scholar Howard University 9/63-6/67 
 Ralph Bunche Scholarship Howard University 9/63

Books

Bush was part of a working group of authors in the book Race in the Age of Obama, and a contributor to the book Transnational Africa and Globalization.
He was the author of the books We are Not What We Seem: Black Nationalism and Class Struggle in the American Century, The New Black Vote: Politics and Power in Four American Cities, The End of White World Supremacy: Black Internationalism and the Problem of the Color Line. He also co-authored with Melanie E. L. Bush Tensions in the American Dream: Rhetoric, Reverie or Reality?

In 2019 a collection of scholars, friends and students published: Rod Bush: Lessons from a Radical Black Scholar on Liberation, Love, and Justice https://www.okcir.com/product/rod-bush-lessons-from-a-radical-black-scholar-on-liberation-love-and-justice/> with essays on the lessons that can be learned from Rod's writings, teaching, mentorship and friendship.

References

Black Power
Activists for African-American civil rights
American anti-poverty advocates
American anti-racism activists
American political writers
American male non-fiction writers
American social commentators
2013 deaths
1945 births
20th-century American philosophers
21st-century American philosophers
African-American Christians
African-American philosophers
Black studies scholars
Binghamton University alumni
Faculty